Beth Christine Buchanan (born 10 March 1972) is an Australian actress and Social Worker. She is best known for the television roles in sitcom Hey Dad!, Gemma Ramsay in Neighbours, and Susan Croydon in Blue Heelers. She was also a long-standing member of the Ranters Theatre company.

Early life
Buchanan was born in Sydney, the daughter of musician Tony Buchanan (formerly of Crossfire) and teacher Jo Buchanan. She is the youngest of three children; her brother Miles and sister Simone are also actors.

Career
Buchanan's television work includes appearances in Secret Valley, Runaway Island, Island Trader, Pirates Island, A Country Practice, Home and Away, Stingers, Hey Dad (where her older sister Simone starred as Debbie Kelly) and The Brittas Empire. Her longest running part, between 1994 and 2006, was the recurring role of Susan Croydon, the daughter of Tom Croydon, in the popular series Blue Heelers. Major storylines included becoming a school teacher; attempting to take the blame when drugs were planted in her and Tom's home; and losing her baby as a result of a hit-and-run targeted at her father. Buchanan played Rita Heywood in both series of ABC1's journalism-orientated comedy Lowdown.

Film roles have included Newsfront, Flute Man, A Good Thing Going, Fortress (1986) – based on the Faraday School kidnapping – The Rogue Stallion, and The King. Buchanan also played the title character in Peter Long's short "A Telephone Call for Genevieve Snow" (2000). Adapted from the story by Carmel Bird, it won the Silver Lion Award at the Venice Film Festival in 2000.

Personal life
Buchanan has three sons (Cinto, born 2004; Cesare, born 2007; and Tancredi, born 2010) with her ex partner, playwright Raimondo Cortese. She is an accredited Social Worker with a Master of Social Work (RMIT), has an Arts Diploma in Professional Writing and Editing (RMIT) and an Honours Degree in Performance Writing (Victoria University).

References and notes

External links

Ranters Theatre (official website) RantersTheatre.com

Australian soap opera actresses
Living people
1972 births
Actresses from Sydney